Disney Channel Playlist is a compilation album of music featured in Disney Channel Original Series, as well as Disney Channel Original Movies. It was released by Walt Disney Records on June 9, 2009.

Track listing

Charts and sales

References

2009 compilation albums
Pop compilation albums
Walt Disney Records compilation albums
Disney Channel albums